Oryctocephalus is a genus of trilobite known from the Middle Cambrian Burgess Shale. 24 specimens of Oryctocephalus are known from the Greater Phyllopod bed, where they comprise 0.42% of the community. This small- to medium-sized trilobite's major characteristics are prominent eye ridges, pleural spines, long genal spines, spines on the pygidium, and notably four furrows connecting pairs of pits on its glabella. Juvenile specimens have been found with only 5 or 6 thoracic segments and about one eighth of adult size, as well as about 2 mm wide.

References

External links 
 

Burgess Shale fossils
Corynexochida genera
Oryctocephalidae
Cambrian trilobites